The Buildings at 1104–1110 Seward are two identical apartment buildings in Evanston, Illinois. Both buildings are four-unit apartments built in 1927. Architects Van Gunten & Van Gunten designed the buildings in the Tudor Revival style. The buildings' designs are meant to resemble large homes, an unusual form not seen in any of Evanston's other residential apartments. Each design features a brick exterior, a Tudor arched stone entrance, a two-story bay window, and a gable roof.

The buildings were added to the National Register of Historic Places on September 2, 1986.

References

Buildings and structures on the National Register of Historic Places in Cook County, Illinois
Residential buildings on the National Register of Historic Places in Illinois
Buildings and structures in Evanston, Illinois
Residential buildings completed in 1927
Tudor Revival architecture in Illinois
Apartment buildings in Illinois